HNoMS King Haakon VII was a Royal Norwegian Navy escort ship during World War II, named after King Haakon VII of Norway. She was given to the RNoN by the United States on 16 September 1942, in the presence of President Franklin D. Roosevelt and Norwegian Crown Princess Märtha.

Handover ceremony
The original intention of the US authorities had been to hand over the warship to the exiled Norwegians on 3 August 1942, on the 70th birthday of King Haakon VII. This plan could however not be carried out as Crown Princess Märtha was going spend that day with her father-in-law the King in London and the handover date was postponed.

During the handover ceremony Roosevelt delivered his famous "Look to Norway" - speech.

King Haakon VII was formerly part of the U.S. Navy as USS PC 467. The ship was built in Neponset, Massachusetts where she was launched on 29 April 1942.

Norwegian service
HNoMS King Haakon VII, under her first commander kapteinløytnant (Lieutenant) Leif R. Lund, was first based at Halifax. Later on she was moved to Red Bay in Newfoundland and Labrador. In November 1942 she took part in the escorting of eastbound transatlantic convoy SC-108. This trip showed that the small vessel was not sturdy enough for transatlantic escorting and after a spell in the UK she relocated to St. John's, Newfoundland and Labrador in May 1943. For the rest of World War II King Haakon VII escorted convoys on the coast of North and Central America, from the coast of Labrador to the Caribbean. During her war service King Haakon VII sailed  and escorted 79 convoys without accidents. No men were lost or seriously injured on King Haakon VII during the war years. From 3 May to 2 June 1945 King Haakon VII was at Key West for maintenance and repairs, this delaying her the start of her return voyage to Norway until 4 June. On 26 June 1945 King Haakon VII arrived at the southern Norwegian port of Kristiansand.

Decommissioning and sale
She was decommissioned on 1 February 1951 and laid up in Trondheim. On 26 June 1952 the Norwegian Parliament decided that King Haakon VII was to be decommissioned and sold off.

Footnotes

Literature
 
 
 
 
 

PC-461-class submarine chasers of the Royal Norwegian Navy
Ships transferred from the United States Navy to the Royal Norwegian Navy
World War II patrol vessels of Norway
1942 ships
Ships built in Boston
PC-467